God's Playground: A History of Poland is a history book in two volumes written by Norman Davies, covering a 1000-year history of Poland. Volume 1: The origins to 1795, and Volume 2: 1795 to the present first appeared as the Oxford Clarendon Press publication in 1981 and have since been reprinted in multiple times, and translated into Polish as Boże igrzysko : Historia Polski by Elżbieta Tabakowska (2 volumes in 1, with 1183 pages by Znak Publishers of Kraków). Davies was inspired to the title by Jan Kochanowski's 1580s poem Boże igrzysko ("Mankind: Bauble of the Gods").

The book, which most editions split into two volumes, has received favourable reviews in the international press, and is considered by many historians and other scholars to be one of the best English-language books on the subject of the history of Poland. The author received several Polish honours.

Selected editions
English
 God's Playground, Columbia University Press, 1979
 God's Playground, Oxford University Press, 1981,  (vol. 1),  (vol. 2)
 God's Playground, Columbia University Press, 1983
 God's Playground, Oxford University Press, 1983,  (vol. 2)
 God's Playground, Columbia University Press, 1984,  (vol.1),  (vol. 2)
 God's Playground, Columbia University Press, 2005,  (vol. 1),  (vol. 2)
Polish
 Boże igrzysko, bibuła edition in the 1980s
 Boże igrzysko, ZNAK 1989, 
 Boże igrzysko, ZNAK 1994, 
 Boże igrzysko, ZNAK 1999
 Boże igrzysko, ZNAK 2006,

Notes

External links
Google Books online preview

1979 non-fiction books
Books by Norman Davies
History books about Poland
20th-century history books
English-language books